The Grace Leven Prize for Poetry was an annual poetry award in Australia, given in the name of Grace Leven who died in 1922. It was established by William Baylebridge who "made a provision for an annual poetry prize in memory of 'my benefactress Grace Leven' and for the publication of his own work". Grace was his mother's half-sister.

The award is made to "the best volume of poetry published in the preceding twelve months by a writer either Australian-born, or naturalised in Australia and resident in Australia for not less than ten years". It offers only a small monetary prize, but is highly regarded by poets. It was first awarded in 1947, with the recipient being Nan McDonald's Pacific Sea. In 2012 the prize was awarded for the final time.

Award winners

2010s
 2012: Joint winners
 Rawshock by Toby Fitch
 Autoethnographic by Michael Brennan
 The Collected Blue Hills by Laurie Duggan
 Jaguar's Dream by John Kinsella
 Another Fine Morning in Paradise by Michael Sharkey
 2010: Joint winners
 Phantom Limb by David Musgrave
 Patience, Mutiny by LK Holt
 The Simplified World by Petra White

2000s
 2008: The Australian Popular Songbook by Alan Wearne
 2007: The Goldfinches of Baghdad by Robert Adamson
 2006: The Past Completes Me: Selected Poems 1973–2003 by Alan Gould
 2005: Next to Nothing by Noel Rowe
 2004: Totem by Luke Davies
 2003: Lost in the Foreground by Stephen Edgar
 2002: Versary by Kate Lilley
 2001: Darker and Lighter by Geoff Page

1990s
 1997: The Undertow: New and Selected Poems by John Kinsella
 1995: Joint winners
New and Selected Poems by Kevin Hart
Flying the Coop : New and Selected Poems 1972–1994 by Rhyll McMaster
Path of Ghosts: poems 1986–93 by Jemal Sharah
 1993: The End of the Season by Philip Hodgins
 1992: Joint winners
 Empire of Grass by Gary Catalano
 Peniel by Kevin Hart
 1991: Dog Fox Field by Les Murray

1980s
 1989: A Tremendous World in Her Head by Dorothy Hewett
 1988: Under Berlin by John Tranter
 1987: Occasions of Birds and Other Poems by Elizabeth Riddell
 1986: Washing the Money : Poems with Photographs by Rhyll McMaster
 1985: Joint winners
 Selected Poems 1963–1983 by Robert Gray  
 The Amorous Cannibal by Chris Wallace-Crabbe
 1984: The Three Fates and Other Poems by Rosemary Dobson
 1983: Collected Poems by Peter Porter
 1982: Tide Country by Vivian Smith
 1981: Nero's Poems: Translations of the Public and Private Poems of the Emperor Nero by Geoffrey Lehmann
 1980: The Boys Who Stole the Funeral by Les Murray

1970s
 1979: The Man in the Honeysuckle by David Campbell
 1978: Sometimes Gladness: Collected Poems 1954–1978 by Bruce Dawe
 1977: Selected Poems by Robert Adamson
 1976: Selected Poems 1939–1975 by John Blight
 1975: Selected Poems (1975) by Gwen Harwood
 1974: Neighbours in a Thicket: Poems by David Malouf
 1973:  A Soapbox Omnibus by Rodney Hall
 1972: Head-Waters by Peter Skrzynecki
 1971: Joint winners
 Collected Poems, 1942–1970 by Judith Wright
 Collected Poems 1936–1970 by James McAuley
 1970: Letters to Live Poets by Bruce Beaver

1960s
 1969: A Counterfeit Silence: Selected Poems by Randolph Stow
 1968: Selected Poems 1942–1968 by David Campbell
 1967: Collected Poems 1936–1967 by Douglas Stewart
 1966: The Talking Clothes: Poems by William Hart-Smith
 1965: The Ilex Tree by Les Murray and Geoffrey Lehmann
 1964: All the Room by David Rowbotham
 1963: The North-Bound Rider by Ian Mudie
 1962: Southmost Twelve by R. D. Fitzgerald
 1961: Time on Fire by Thomas Shapcott
 1960: Man in a Landscape by Colin Thiele

1950s
 1959: The Wind at Your Door by R. D. Fitzgerald
 1958: Antipodes in Shoes by Geoffrey Dutton
 1957: Elegiac and Other Poems by Leonard Mann
 1955: The Wandering Islands by A. D. Hope
 1954: Thirty Poems by John Thompson
 1953: Tumult of the Swans by Roland Robinson
 1952: Between Two Tides by R. D. Fitzgerald
 1951: The Great South Land: An Epic Poem by Rex Ingamells

1940s
 1949: Woman to Man by Judith Wright
 1948: A Drum for Ben Boyd by Francis Webb
 1947: Pacific Sea by Nan McDonald

Notes

References
AusLit News April–May 2007. Retrieved 17 July 2007
Bonnin, Nancy (1979) "Baylebridge, William (1883–1942)", Australian Dictionary of Biography
 
Munro, Craig & Sheahan-Bright, Robyn (2006). Paper Empires: A History of the Book in Australia 1946–2005. St Lucia, University of Queensland Press
 
 Wilde, W., Hooton, J. & Andrews, B (1994) The Oxford Companion of Australian Literature 2nd ed. South Melbourne, Oxford University Press
 

Australian poetry awards
Awards established in 1947
1947 establishments in Australia